Horesidotes cinereus, the ash-gray range grasshopper, is a species of slant-faced grasshopper in the family Acrididae. It is found in Central America and North America.

Subspecies
These two subspecies belong to the species Horesidotes cinereus:
 Horesidotes cinereus cinereus Scudder, 1899
 Horesidotes cinereus saltator Hebard, 1931

References

Further reading

 

Gomphocerinae
Articles created by Qbugbot
Insects described in 1899